Louth County Hospital is a public hospital in Dundalk, County Louth, Ireland. It is managed by RCSI Hospitals.

History
The hospital has its origins in a building in the Crescent, which is now occupied by Dundalk Grammar School, and opened as the Louth Infirmary in 1834. The aging infirmary was replaced by a new facility in Dublin Road which was built at a cost of €500,000 and was officially opened on 3 July 1959. The accident and emergency department was replaced by a minor injuries unit in June 2010, despite years of campaigning by local people for it to be kept open.

References

External links

Health Service Executive hospitals
Hospital buildings completed in 1959
1834 establishments in Ireland
Buildings and structures in Dundalk
Hospitals established in 1834
Hospitals in County Louth
20th-century architecture in the Republic of Ireland